Lieutenant Colonel Sir Frederick Harrison (184431 December 1914) was railway manager and an officer in the British Army's Engineer and Railway Volunteer Staff Corps.

Harrison was born in Croydon, Surrey, the son of George Harrison of Newport, Monmouthshire.

At the age of twenty, Harrison became a clerk on the London and North Western Railway (LNWR) at Shrewsbury. He rose through the ranks, working at Euston under George Findlay, the General Goods Manager; a later post was that of Assistant District Superintendent at Liverpool, and in 1874 he moved to the equivalent job at Chester. He remained there for a year before, aged 31, becoming Assistant Superintendent of the Line. Ten years after this he was appointed Chief Goods Manager of the LNWR. His next promotion was in 1893, when he became General Manager of the LNWR, a post he held until the end of 1908. The following year he joined the Board of the South Eastern Railway, very soon becoming Deputy Chairman, and also being appointed to the South Eastern & Chatham Railway Companies Joint Management Committee; he served these bodies until his death.

He was made a knight bachelor in December 1902.

He married firstly, Fanny Louisa Thomas (1848–1883), and secondly, in 1888, Jessie Margaret Goldie, daughter of Charles Dashwood Goldie.

References

Sources
 "HARRISON, Lt-Col Sir Frederick", Who Was Who, A & C Black, 1920–2008; online edn, Oxford University Press, December 2007

Further reading

1844 births
1914 deaths
Engineer and Railway Staff Corps officers
Knights Bachelor
London and North Western Railway people
South Eastern and Chatham Railway people